The Oil Springs Fire was a wildfire that started north of Grand Junction, Colorado on June 18, 2021. The fire burned  and was fully contained on July 10, 2021.

Events

June 
The Oil Springs Fire was first reported on June 18, 2021, at around 6:45 pm MDT.

Cause 
The cause of the fire is believed to be due to lightning.

Containment 
On July 10, 2021, the Oil Springs Fire reached 100% containment.

Impact

Closures and Evacuations

See also 

 2021 Colorado wildfires
 List of Colorado wildfires

References 

2021 Colorado wildfires
June 2021 events in the United States
Wildfires in Colorado